The 2015 ARFU Men's Sevens Championships is an Olympic qualification tournament for rugby sevens at the 2016 Summer Olympics which was held in Hong Kong on 7–8 November 2015. It was originally planned to use the 2015 Asian Sevens Series for the qualification but as the series clashed with the 2015 Rugby World Cup hosted in England, it was decided to use one qualifying tournament (with a pre-qualifying round) for Asia.  

The Preliminary round was held in Chennai, India on 7–8 March 2015.

Pre-qualifying round

Pool stage

Semifinals

Third Place Match

Final

Final standing

Olympic qualifying round

Teams 
  (Automatic qualifier)
  (Automatic qualifier)
  (Host Nation)
  (Preliminary round qualifier)
  (Automatic qualifier)
  (Automatic qualifier) (withdrawn)
  (Automatic qualifier)
  (Automatic qualifier)
  (Automatic qualifier)
  (Automatic qualifier)
  (Automatic qualifier)
  (Automatic qualifier) (withdrawn)

Pool stage 

All match times are HKT (UTC+8).

Pool A

Pool B

Playoffs

9th/10th Place Playoff

Plate Semifinals

7th/8th Place Playoff

Plate Final

Cup Semifinal

3rd/4th Place Playoff

Cup Final

Final standings

References

Rugby sevens at the 2016 Summer Olympics – Men's tournament
2015 rugby sevens competitions
International rugby union competitions hosted by Hong Kong
2015 in Hong Kong sport